The Sint Maarten national football team is the football team of Sint Maarten, the Dutch half of the Caribbean island of Saint Martin, and is controlled by the Sint Maarten Soccer Association. Sint Maarten is not a member of FIFA, and therefore not eligible to enter the World Cup. However, the association applied for FIFA membership in 2016 but was rejected. In April 2022, the Sint Maarten Soccer Association appealed to the CAS against FIFA’s ruling.

In 2002, the Sint Maarten Soccer Association was given associate membership in CONCACAF and became full members at the XXVIII Ordinary Congress in April 2013 after becoming an independent country of the Kingdom of the Netherlands after the Netherlands Antilles was dissolved in 2010. They are also members of the Caribbean Football Union and first took part in the Caribbean Cup in its inaugural edition in 1989.

History
From 1992 to 2016, the team had played approximately only 25 official matches. Between 2000 and 2016, only one match had been played, an unofficial 2–2 draw at home to Sint Eustatius on 20 August 2004. In 2012, SMSA President Owen Nickie stated that the national team's inactivity was due to a lack of needed improvements on their home stadium. He indicated that not having enough players to choose from had also prevented the team from competing in the past but that they had more than enough players at that time. At that time, the association discussed hosting the Leeward Islands Tournament and participating in 2012 Caribbean Cup qualification as two of its objectives for the year. Nickie described not entering a team in the Caribbean Cup in the past as "unfortunate". In August 2014, Sint Maarten was set to co-host the Leeward Islands Tournament which had been dormant at that time for over ten years. However, the tournament was postponed after Sint Maarten withdrew as host because of difficulties with the newly installed lights at the Raoul Illidge Sports Complex and Anguilla, the other host, withdrew for unspecified reasons. One report also indicated that the hosts withdrew because of an "inability to facilitate teams." In May 2015, a match was organized by the SMSA as a showcase for selecting a national team player pool. It was open to all players with a Dutch passport. Although Sint Maarten's senior team was dormant, a youth selection participated in the inaugural CONCACAF Under-15 Championship in August 2013 and Sint Maarten co-hosted the 2015 CFU Boy's Under-15 Championship after the 2015 CONCACAF Under-15 Championship was canceled by CONCACAF for unspecified reasons.

2017 Caribbean Cup
Sint Maarten returned to international football in 2016, entering 2017 Caribbean Cup qualification and being drawn into Group 2 along with Grenada and the US Virgin Islands with the first round matches taking place on 22 and 26 March 2016. Sint Maarten had been absent from senior CFU competition for nineteen years as they entered the tournament. In January 2016 it was announced that Sint Maarten's squad for 2017 Caribbean Cup qualification would be composed solely of players from Flames United SC, reigning champions from the 2014/2015 Senior league competitions and the champions of the 2012/2013 Excellence Division between the islands of Sint Maarten, Saint Martin and St. Barths. However, shortly thereafter it was reported that the previous report was inaccurate and that Flames United would actually be competing in the CFU Club Championship. Sint Maarten played its first senior men's international in 12 years on 13 March 2016 as it hosted a 2–0 home victory against Anguilla as part of each side's preparation for 2017 Caribbean Cup qualification. Both of Sint Maarten's goals were scored by Joost Röben. In the first match of the tournament, Sint Maarten held Grenada to a scoreless draw in the first half which saw two of Sint Maarten's starters sustain injuries. It was later revealed that Raymond Wolff had sustained a broken rib before coming off in the first half while fellow-Dutchman Rick De Punder was credited with an own goal. Grenada scored five goals in the second half to secure the 5–0 victory. Sint Maarten arrived on Grenada for the 8pm match at 4pm after the funds for the team airfare, paid for by the CFU, did not reach the airline in time and no seats were available. SMSA President Johnny Singh thought that the team would not be able to compete but another flight was arranged in time. The same scenario occurred for the return flight but the team was expected to be home on the Thursday prior to the team's match against USVI on Saturday. Sint Maarten went on to lose the match to USVI 1–2, ending the team's qualifying campaign. Sint Maarten's only goal was scored by Ramsleii Boelijn.

Stadium

Sint Maarten plays its home matches at the Raoul Illidge Sports Complex in Philipsburg. The stadium has a capacity of 3,000 spectators. It is named after Raoul Illidge, a local philanthropist who laid the groundwork and covered many expenses in the planning of the stadium as part of his support for sport and culture on the island. Unsolicited, he contributed nearly ƒ800,000 for the project. After falling into disrepair, the complex was temporarily closed for renovation in July 2013. The two-part renovation included installation of a new running track, drainage system, and artificial turf, repainting of lighting poles and installation of new, brighter lights, in addition to a renovation of the complex's buildings. The renovation costs were financed by the Dutch funding agency Usona and the Sint Maarten government. The international sports park was official reopened with a ribbon cutting ceremony by Prime Minister Sarah Wescot-Williams and Minister of Education, Culture, Youth and Sports Affairs Patricia Lourens-Phillip on 7 March 2014.

Results and fixtures

The following is a list of match results in the last 12 months, as well as any future matches that have been scheduled.

2022

2023

Players

Current squad
The following players were called up for the CONCACAF Nations League matches in June 2022.

Caps and goals as of 14 June 2022 after the game against Turks and Caicos Islands.

Records

Players in bold are still active with Sint Maarten.

Most appearances

Top goalscorers

Managers
 Ronny Wadilie (2016–18)
 Elvis Albertus (2018–)

Competitive record

CONCACAF Gold Cup

CONCACAF Nations League

Caribbean Cup

*Draws include knockout matches decided on penalty kicks.

Head-to-head record

Footnotes

References

External links
CONCACAF profile
CFU profile
Caribbean Football Database profile
National Football Teams profile

 
Caribbean national association football teams
CONCACAF teams not affiliated to FIFA
Football in Sint Maarten